The Cossinae are the nominate subfamily of the Cossidae (carpenter or goat moths). The caterpillars of several Cossinae species, such as the carpenterworm (Prionoxystus robiniae) and the goat moth (Cossus cossus), are significant pests. On the other hand, in Chile the caterpillars of the Chilean moth (Chilecomadia moorei) are collected on a commercial scale for sale as fishing bait and terrarium pet food; they are usually called "butterworms" in international trade.

The Cossulinae have been separated from the Cossinae in recent decades, but this was not universally accepted at first. Some misplaced genera have been moved between the subfamilies, and as it seems the Cossulinae at least now represent a monophyletic group.

Systematics
Some significant species are also listed:

Unplaced to tribe/placement unknown
 Citharalia Clench, 1957 (formerly in Cossulinae)
 Comadia Barnes & McDunnough, 1911
 Cossodes White, 1841
 Culama Walker, 1856
 Dieidapersa Strand in Stichel, 1911
 Dieida Strand, 1911
 Fania Barnes & McDunnough, 1911 (tentatively placed here)
 Idioses Turner, 1927
 Macrocyttara Turner, 1918
 Miacora Dyar, 1905 (tentatively placed here)
 Prionoxystus Grote, 1882
 Psychidocossus D. S. Fletcher, 1982
 Surcossus Heimlich, 1960
 Trigena Dyar, 1905 (formerly in Cossulinae)
 Zyganisus Viette, 1951
 Zeuzerocossini Yakovlev, 2008
 Acossus Dyar, 1905
 Alcterogystia Schoorl, 1990
 Arctiocossus Felder, 1874
 Assegaj Yakovlev, 2006
 Brachygystia Schoorl, 1990
 Chingizid Yakovlev, 2011
 Chinocossus Yakovlev, 2006
 Dervishiya Yakovlev, 2006
 Eogystia Schoorl, 1990
 Eremocossus Hampson, 1893
 Gobibatyr Yakovlev, 2004
 Kalimantanossus Yakovlev, 2011
 Mahommedella Yakovlev, 2011
 Neurocossus Yakovlev, 2010
 Paropta Staudinger, 1900
 Patoptoformis Yakovlev, 2006
 Planctogystia Schoorl, 1990
 Rethona Walker, 1855
 Ronaldocossus Yakovlev, 2006
 Wiltshirocossus Yakovlev, 2007
 Zeuzerocossus Yakovlev, 2008
 Endagriini Duponchel, [1845]
 Afroarabiella Yakovlev, 2008
 Dyspessa Hübner, 1820
 Groenendaelia Yakovlev, 2004
 Hollowiella Yakovlev & Witt, 2009
 Isoceras Turati, 1924
 Paracossulus Schoorl, 1990
 Stygoides Bruand, 1853
 Samagystia Schoorl, 1990
 Holcocerini Yakovlev, 2006
 Afrikanetz Yakovlev, 2009
 Aholcocerus Yakovlev, 2006
 Barchaniella Yakovlev, 2006
 Brachylia Felder, 1874
 Camellocossus Yakovlev, 2011
 Coryphodema Felder, 1874
 Cossulus Staudinger, 1887
 Cossus Fabricius, 1794
 Cryptoholcocerus Yakovlev, 2006
 Deserticossus Yakovlev, 2006
 Dyspessacossus Daniel, 1953
 Franzdanielia Yakovlev, 2006
 Gumilevia Yakovlev, 2011
 Hirtocossus Schoorl, 1990
 Holcocerus Staudinger, 1884
 Isocossus Roepke, 1957
 Kerzhnerocossus Yakovlev, 2011
 Koboldocossus Yakovlev, 2011
 Kotchevnik Yakovlev, 2004
 Mirocossus Schoorl, 1990
 Macrocossus Aurivillius, 1900
 Mormogystia Schoorl, 1990
 Paracossus Hampson, 1904
 Parahypopta Daniel, 1961
 Plyustchiella Yakovlev, 2006
 Pygmeocossus Yakovlev, 2005
 Rambuasalama Yakovlev & Saldaitis, 2008
 Reticulocossus Yakovlev, 2011
 Roepkiella Yakovlev & Witt, 2009
 Semitocossus Yakovlev, 2007
 Streltzoviella Yakovlev, 2006
 Sundacossus Yakovlev, 2006
 Vartiania Yakovlev, 2004
 Wittocossus Yakovlev, 2004
 Yakudza Yakovlev, 2006

Former genera
 Bifiduncus
 Butaya Yakovlev, 2004
 Catopta Staudinger, 1899
 Chiangmaiana Kemal & Koçak, 2005 (≡Nirvana Yakovlev, 2004 nom. invalid.(preoc.name) non Stål, 1859 nec Kirkaldy, 1900 nec Yakovlev, 2007 nec Tsukuda & Nishiyama, 1979);(≡Nirrvanna Yakovlev, 2007 nom. invalid.( junior object. syn.), objective replacement name (mistaken repl.n.))
 Chilecomadia
 Danielostygia Reisser, 1962 (tentatively placed here)
 Lamellocossus Daniel, 1956 (tentatively placed here)
 Toronia Barnes & McDunnough, 1911
 Yakovlevina Kemal & Koçak, 2005 (=Garuda Yakovlev, 2005)
 Stygia Latreille, 1803 (tentatively placed here)

Footnotes

References

  (2008): Lepidoptera and Some Other Life Forms Cossinae. Version of 17 July 2008. Retrieved 27 February 2009.
 Ревизия древоточцев рода Holcocerus Staudinger, 1884 (s. l.)

 
Moth subfamilies